Mark Healy (born 1960) is an Irish former Gaelic footballer who played as a full-back at senior level for the Cork county team.

Healy joined the panel during the 1981 championship and was a regular member of the starting fifteen for four seasons until his retirement after the 1984 championship. During that time he won one Munster medal.

At club level Healy is an All-Ireland medalist with St Finbarr's In addition to this he also won two Munster medals and two county club championship medals.

References

1960 births
Living people
Cork inter-county Gaelic footballers
St Finbarr's Gaelic footballers